Durham (Mulock) Airport, formerly , was located  northwest of Durham in the community of Mulock, Ontario, Canada.

References

External links
Page about this airport on COPA's Places to Fly airport directory

Defunct airports in Ontario